Poa poiformis, commonly known as coast tussock-grass or blue tussock-grass, is a densely tufted, erect, perennial tussock grass, with distinctive blue-green leaves, that grows to about 1 m in height.  Its inflorescences are arranged in a dense panicle up to 30 cm long.  It is native to coastal southern Australia where it occurs along ocean foreshores, estuaries, dunes and cliffs. P. poiformis is also found on Kangaroo Island (South Australia) and Lord Howe Island (New South Wales).

Varieties
 Poa poiformis var. poiformis (autonym)
 Poa poiformis var. ramifer D.I.Morris – Trailing coast tussock-grass

Var. ramifer is currently being studied to determine if it is synonymous with var. poiformis

References

poiformis
Poales of Australia
Flora of New South Wales
Flora of Lord Howe Island
Flora of South Australia
Flora of Tasmania
Flora of Victoria (Australia)
Flora of Western Australia
Plants described in 1804
Taxa named by Jacques Labillardière